The 1949 County Championship was the 50th officially organised running of the County Championship.

The Championship was shared for the first time in its history between Middlesex County Cricket Club and Yorkshire County Cricket Club.

Table
12 points for a win
6 points to each side in a match in which scores finish level
4 points for first innings lead in a lost or drawn match
2 points for tie on first innings in a lost or drawn match

If no play possible on the first two days, the match played to one-day laws with 8 points for a win.

References

1949 in English cricket
County Championship seasons